The  International League season took place from April to September 2006.

The Toledo Mud Hens defeated the Rochester Red Wings to win the league championship.

Attendance
Buffalo - 607,929
Charlotte - 306,408
Columbus - 518,875
Durham - 507,547
Indianapolis - 547,768
Louisville - 652,692
Norfolk - 463,769
Ottawa - 122,574
Pawtucket - 613,065
Richmond - 321,696
Rochester - 476,734
Scranton/W.B. - 381,179
Syracuse - 347,699
Toledo - 606,457

Playoffs
The following teams qualified for the postseason:  Charlotte Knights, Indianapolis Indians, Rochester Red Wings, Scranton/Wilkes-Barre Red Barons, and Toledo Mud Hens.

Division Series
Toledo and Indianapolis played a one-game playoff to determine the IL west division title

Winner: Toledo; Indianapolis eliminated

IL West Champions: Toledo
IL South Champions: Charlotte

Winner: Toledo

IL North Champions:    Scranton
IL Wild Card Champions: Rochester

Winner: Rochester

Championship series
The Toledo Mud Hens defeated the Rochester Red Wings three games to two to win their second straight Governors' Cup and third overall. Toledo would represent the International League in the Triple A Championship game in Oklahoma. They lost to the Tucson Sidewinders. Tucson now plays in Reno. Their team name is the Reno Aces.

References

External links
International League official website

 
International League seasons